Khwaja Nizam ad Din (Urdu|خواجہ نظام الدین) was a Muslim Sufi in the remote village of Kahiyan Sharif in Neelam Valley, Azad Kashmir. He was the religious leader of Baba Ji Muhammad Qasim Sadiq and his eldest son Pir Nazeer Ahmed of Mohra Sharif.

References

Kashmiri people
Pakistani Sufis
Pakistani Sufi religious leaders